Deborah Walley (August 12, 1941May 10, 2001) was an American actress noted for playing the title role in Gidget Goes Hawaiian (1961) and appearing in several beach party films.

Early years
Walley was born in Bridgeport, Connecticut, to Ice Capades skating stars and choreographers Nathan and Edith Walley. When she was three years old, she made her first public appearance at Madison Square Garden.

Walley attended Central High School in Bridgeport. In her teens, she decided to pursue a career in acting. At 14, she debuted on stage in a summer stock production of Charley's Aunt.

During her sophomore year, Walley attended Rosarian Academy in West Palm Beach, Florida, where she was cast as Cinderella in a musical production at the Royal Poinciana Playhouse. She studied acting at New York City's American Academy of Dramatic Arts.

Career
Walley appeared on television in episodes of Naked City ("To Walk in Silence ") and Route 66 ("Ten Drops of Water").

Early film career
Walley was discovered by agent Joyce Selznick while performing in a production of Anton Chekhov's Three Sisters, and she soon made her Hollywood film debut as Gidget in 1961's Gidget Goes Hawaiian. The film was popular and established Walley as a name among teenage fans and she won the Photoplay award for Favorite Female Newcomer. She was named Photoplay magazine's most popular actress of 1961.

Disney hired Walley to play an ingenue in two comedies, Bon Voyage! (1962) and Summer Magic (1963), and she sang in the latter.

She appeared in The Young Lovers (1964) for MGM.

Walley signed a contract with American International Pictures, which cast her as a female lead in several comedies, all with Frankie Avalon and her husband John Ashley: Beach Blanket Bingo (1965), Ski Party (1965) and Sergeant Dead Head (1965). She sang in some of these films.

Walley had a cameo role in Dr. Goldfoot and the Bikini Machine (1966) and was the female lead in the last AIP beach-party film, Ghost in the Invisible Bikini (1966), opposite Tommy Kirk. She reunited with Kirk for a beach-party film directed by Stephanie Rothman titled It's a Bikini World (filmed in 1965, released in 1967).

She next appeared in the Elvis Presley film Spinout, followed by the lead role in the science-fiction film The Bubble (1966).

Television
Walley guest-starred on Burke's Law ("Who Killed Andy Zygmunt?"), The Greatest Show on Earth ("This Train Don't Stop Till It Gets There"), Wagon Train ("The Nancy Styles Story") and Gomer Pyle: USMC ("Lies, Lies, Lies"), The Men from Shiloh ("With Love, Bullets and Valentines"), Off to See the Wizard ("Rhino") and Love, American Style.

In 1967, with her film career in decline, Walley portrayed Suzie Hubbard Buell in the comedy series The Mothers-in-Law. Actress Kay Cole had played Suzie in the original pilot, but Walley replaced her for the series' two seasons on the air.

Walley worked as an art director on The Courtship of Eddie's Father and an episode of The Girl from U.N.C.L.E. ("The Double-O-Nothing Affair").

Later career
Walley's later film appearances included Drag Racer (1971), The Severed Arm (1973) and Benji (1974).

She continued to guest-star on shows such as The Hardy Boys/Nancy Drew Mysteries ("Mystery on the Avalanche Express") and Simon & Simon ("The Last Big Break"). She wrote and produced the short film The Legend of Seeks-To-Hunt-Great (1989), which won several awards including the National Cine Golden Eagle, the American Indian Film Festival's best short-subject award, the Oklahoma Tribal Council Award for best fiction film and the 1991 Algrave International Video Festival's best-of-festival award.

Walley moved to Sedona, Arizona in 1991 to focus on raising her family while writing and producing. She cofounded Pied Piper Productions, a nonprofit theater company for children, and was a cofounder of the Sedona Children's Theater.

She published her first book, Grandfather's Good Medicine, in 1993, which was based on the plot of The Legend of Seeks-To-Hunt-Great. She also wrote scripts and taught acting and production techniques to American Indians through her Swiftwind Productions company, and she continued to produce and appear in plays.

Walley returned to Hollywood in 1999, where she pursued acting as a "hobby." She appeared on Baywatch and the daytime soap opera Passions. She continued to work with children through her Imagination Playshops, acting workshops for children in the U.S. and Australia. She also worked with the Educational Theater Company, a multiethnic organization based in Los Angeles.

Personal life and death
Walley's first marriage was to John Reynolds, with whom she had a son named Justin. From 1962 to 1966, Walley was married to actor John Ashley and had another son, Anthony. Two years after divorcing Ashley, she married Chet McCracken, with whom she remained until divorcing him in 1975.

In May 2001, Walley died of esophageal cancer at her home in Sedona, Arizona, at age 59.

Filmography

Film

Television

Notes

References

External links

Deborah Walley at Brian's Drive-in Theatre

American film actresses
American television actresses
American stage actresses
Actresses from Connecticut
People from Sedona, Arizona
1941 births
2001 deaths
Actresses from Bridgeport, Connecticut
American Academy of Dramatic Arts alumni
Deaths from esophageal cancer
Deaths from cancer in Arizona
20th-century American actresses
Central High School (Connecticut) alumni